Helenopolis may refer to:

 Helenopolis (Bithynia), ancient city in Asia Minor, modern Turkey
 Helenopolis (Palestine), ancient city in Palestine
 Helenopolis (Lydia), possibly an ancient city in Lydia

See also
 Hellenopolis, an ancient city in Anatolia